Biyelgee (Mongolian Cyrillic: Биелгээ) or Bii (Mongolian Cyrillic: Бий), is a unique form of dance, originated from the nomadic way of life. 

Almost all regions populated by different ethnic groups of Mongolia have their specific forms of Biyelgee. Especially the Western Mongols (Oirats) is famous for its Biyelgee dance.

Origin
Biyelgee dances embody and originate from the nomadic way of life and are performed while half sitting or cross-legged. Hand, shoulder and leg movements express aspects of Mongol herders everyday lifestyle such as milking the cow, cooking, hunting, household labor, customs and traditions,  etc. as well as spiritual characteristics tied to different ethnic groups.
Originally, Mongolian dance developed very early is evidenced by a reference in The Secret History of the Mongols were wont to rejoice, dancing and feasting ... they danced until there was dust up to their knees ...

Musical instruments
In Biyelgee, music plays an important part in the choreographic art of the Mongols. Many of the folk dances are performed to the accompaniment of the Tovshuur, Morin Khuur (Horse-headed fiddle), ikhel, sometimes in combination with other instruments.
There are also dances which are performed exclusively to the accompaniment of the human voice, for example, the Buryat dance Yohor.

Choreography
Choreography is rich and diverse, since people living in different parts of the country employ different means of expressing their feelings. 
Biyelgee is traditionally performed on the rather limited space before the hearth, so the dancers make practically no use of their feet. Instead, the dancers principally use only the upper part of their bodies, and through their rhythmic movements express various aspects of their identities, such as sex, tribe, and ethic group. 
Dance Movements, which can be made within a restricted space, are essential features in which the smallness of the space is compensated by the expressiveness of the movements of hands, shoulders, chest, waist, eyes and head.

Styles
Each Mongolian ethnic group has its own particular form of expression. For example:
 The Dörvöd and the Torguud accompany their dances with dance songs;
 The Bayid dance with their knees bent outwards, balancing on them mugs filled with sour mare-milk (airag);
 The Dörvöd balance mugs filled with airag on their heads and hands;
 The Zakhchin dancer squat as they dance, with the body inclined forward;
 The Buryat dance in a circle, always moving in the direction of the sun; a solo singer improvises pairs of verses followed by the chorus singing the refrain.

References 

 Marsh, Peter K. (2004). Horse-Head Fiddle and the Cosmopolitan Reimagination of Mongolia. .
 Pegg, Carole (2003) Mongolian Music, Dance, and Oral Narrative: Recovering Performance Traditions (with audio CD)

External links 

Dance in Mongolia
Asian dances
Mongolian culture
Intangible Cultural Heritage in Need of Urgent Safeguarding